Midnight in Paris is an album by American pianist, composer and bandleader Duke Ellington recorded in 1962 for the Columbia label. The album features performances of compositions inspired by or associated with Paris.

Reception

The Allmusic review by Scott Yanow awarded the album 1½ stars and stated "One of the odder Duke Ellington collections... Pretty music but far from essential".

Track listing
 "Under Paris Skies" (Hubert Giraud) – 2:41
 "I Wish You Love" (Charles Trenet) – 3:50 
 "Mademoiselle de Paris" (Paul Durand) – 3:20
 "Comme Çi Comme Ça" (Bruno Coquatrix) – 3:03
 "Speak to Me of Love" (Jean Lenoir) – 2:02
 "A Midnight in Paris" (Billy Strayhorn) – 3:33 
 "(All of a Sudden) My Heart Sings" (Harold Rome, Jean Marie Blanvillain, Henry Herpin) – 2:03
 "Guitar Amour" (Duke Ellington) – 4:57
 "The Petite Waltz" (Joe Heyne) – 4:14
 "Paris Blues" (Ellington) – 4:21  
 "Javapachacha (Apache)" (adapted by Ellington) – 3:56
 "No Regrets" (Charles Dumont) – 2:12 
 "The River Seine" (Guy Lafarge) – 2:14
Recorded at Columbia Studio A, New York on January 30, 1962 (tracks 5, 8 & 10), January 31, 1962 (tracks 4, 9 & 11), February 27, 1962 (track 1), June 21, 1962 (tracks 3 & 6), and June 26, 1962 (tracks 2, 7, 12 & 13).

Personnel
Duke Ellington – piano (tracks 1-3, 6, 7, 12 & 13)
Billy Strayhorn - piano (tracks 4, 5 & 8-11)
Ray Nance - cornet
Cat Anderson, Shorty Baker (tracks 1, 4, 5 & 8-11), Bill Berry (tracks 2, 5, 7, 8, & 11-13), Roy Burrowes (tracks 1-3, 6, 7, 12 & 13), Howard McGhee (tracks 4, 9 & 11) - trumpet
Lawrence Brown, Buster Cooper (tracks 1-3, 6, 7, 12 & 13), Lyle Cox (tracks 4, 5 & 8-11) - trombone
Chuck Connors - bass trombone
Jimmy Hamilton - clarinet, tenor saxophone
Johnny Hodges - alto saxophone
Russell Procope - alto saxophone, clarinet
Paul Gonsalves - tenor saxophone
Harry Carney - baritone saxophone, clarinet, bass clarinet
Aaron Bell - bass 
Sam Woodyard - drums

References

Columbia Records albums
Duke Ellington albums
1962 albums
Albums produced by Teo Macero